Pride Fest may refer to:

Pride Fest (Bismarck and Mandan, North Dakota)
PrideFest (Denver)
PrideFest (Milwaukee)
PrideFest (St. Louis)
Pridefest (video game)

See also
 Pride parade